Longhorns & Londonbridges is a 1974 album by B. J. Thomas, released on Paramount Records, during the time when rights to the Paramount Records name were owned by Paramount Pictures.  It is commonly misidentified as Longhorn & London Bridges.

Album history
Longhorns and Londonbridges was the second and final album that Thomas recorded for Paramount Records, following the end of his six-year relationship with Scepter Records in 1972. The record was released in the same year that Paramount Pictures sold its rights in the Paramount Records label to ABC Records, which in turn was sold to MCA Records in 1979. At this point, ABC Records was dissolved as an independent record label, with only the best-selling ABC recordings being reissued on MCA Records. In a twist of irony, MCA via subsidiaries Universal Studios and EMKA, Ltd., already owned the rights to most sound feature films released by Paramount Pictures prior to 1950.

The distribution and sales of many records released during this period of significant label transitions (1974-1979) were negatively affected. Thomas' album releases during this period were all on the Paramount, ABC and MCA labels, and so were similarly affected. While Thomas was to continue with degrees of success in the release of singles, no singles were released from Longhorns & Londonbridges and its chart success was marginal. It was not reissued by MCA Records and has not been reissued on CD.

Longhorns & Londonbridges contains some of the last recordings of Professor Alex Bradford, a well-known gospel performer. It is also notable for the extensive songwriting and performance contributions of Randall Bramblett, as well as for containing one of the five versions of Allen Toussaint's "Play Something Sweet (Brickyard Blues)" released by various artists in 1974. The album also contains one of the earliest cover versions of a Dennis Locorriere song, as well as one of the earliest of the comparatively rare songwriting collaborations between Gerry Goffin and Mark James. It features the participation of many well-known musicians, such as Randy Brecker, Michael Brecker, Don Grolnick, Lou Marini, Hugh McCracken and Elliott Randall.

Track listing

 "Play Something Sweet (Brickyard Blues)" (Allen Toussaint)
 "I'm Callin'" (Randall Bramblett)
 "Too Many Irons" (Bramblett)
 "Sacred Harmony" (Bramblett)
 "40 Days and 40 Nights" (Bramblett, Davis Causey, Bob Jones)
 "Talkin' Confidentially" (Gerry Goffin, Mark James)
 "City Sunday Morning Day" (Richard Supa)
 "Conversation" (Buddy Buie, J.R. Cobb)
 "I Won't Be Following You" (Dennis Locorriere)
 "Superman" (Bramblett)

Personnel

 David Bargaron - trombone
 Prof. Alex Bradford - vocals
 Randall Bramblett - piano, keyboards, vocals
 Michael Brecker - saxophone
 Randy Brecker - trumpet
 Peter Gordon - horn, French horn
 Al Gorgoni - guitar, vocals, producer
 Paul Griffin - keyboards
 Don Grolnick - keyboards
 Rodney Justo - vocals
 Jimmy Maelen - percussion, tambourine
 Bob Mann - guitar
 Lou Marini - flute, piccolo, saxophone
 Rick Marotta - drums
 Hugh McCracken - guitar
 Andy Muson - bass
 Elliott Randall - guitar
 Allan Schwartzberg - drums
 Lew Soloff - trumpet
 Jon Stroll - keyboards
 Richard Supa - guitar
 Bell Tree - guitar
 Steve Tyrell - percussion, vocals, producer
 Georg Wadenius - guitar
 Paul Buckmaster - orchestral arrangements 
 Shelly Yakus - original balance and mixing engineer

References

1974 albums
B. J. Thomas albums
Albums arranged by Paul Buckmaster